Chanhe Hui District is a district of the city of Luoyang, Henan province, China.

Administrative divisions
As 2012, this district is divided to 5 subdistricts and 1 township.
Subdistricts

Townships
Chanhe Hui Township

References

Districts of Luoyang
Hui people